The Mayroubian (from the type site Mayrouba) is a culture of the Lebanese Stone Age.

The Mayroubian type of site was first detected by Henri Fleisch, who collected surface finds of flint tools and defined a typological variation particular to "mountain sites". Lorraine Copeland and Peter Wescombe preferred use of the term "Meyroubian" after one site was found that was not in the mountains. The term is used to describe around twenty five known surface sites with assemblages of around eighty percent Middle Paleolithic to twenty percent Upper Paleolithic in form. O. Prufer and E. Baldwin noted a resemblance to those in levels seven and nine of Yabrud Shelter I. Henri Fleisch suggested successive occupations from the Middle Paleolithic to the Upper Paleolithic at all sites apart from Jebel Mazloum, which was classed as a transitional Upper Paleolithic site. Francis Hours suggested it was a transitional industry between the Middle Paleolithic and Upper Paleolithic periods and was placed by Copeland and Wescombe in the final Mousterian.

Further reading
 Prufer, O., & Baldwin, E., "Mechmiche and Meyrouba ; two Palaeolithic Stations in the Lebanon, Quartär, vol. 9, p. 61, Freiberg (No date).
 Fleisch, Henri., Les stations préhistoriques de montagne au Liban. Acts of the 6th C.I.S.P.P., Rome, 1962 (1966).
 Hours, Francis., Michmiche :  mélange ou industrie de transition? Acts of the 6th C.I.S.P.P., Rome, 1962 (1966).
 Hours, Francis., Le problème d'apparition du paléolithique supérieur dans le Proche-Orient. Acts of the 4th International Speological Congress, Ljubljana, 1965.

References

Paleolithic
Archaeological cultures of the Near East
Archaeological cultures in Lebanon
Mousterian